

Ladder

Ladder progress

Regular season

2015/16 squad
Players with international caps are listed in bold.
Ages are given as of 17 December 2017, the date of the first match played during the tournament

Home attendance

References

External links
 Official website of the Hobart Hurricanes
 Official website of the Big Bash League

Hobart Hurricanes seasons
2015–16 Big Bash League